Route 333, or Highway 333, may refer to:

Australia
 - Holdsworth Road

Canada
 Newfoundland and Labrador Route 333
 Nova Scotia Route 333
 Prince Edward Island Route 333
 Quebec Route 333

Costa Rica
 National Route 333

Japan
 Japan National Route 333

United States
  Arkansas Highway 333
 County Road 333 (Liberty County, Florida)
  Georgia State Route 333 (former)
  Georgia State Route 333
  Iowa Highway 333
  Kentucky Route 333
  Louisiana Highway 333
  Maryland Route 333
  Minnesota State Highway 333
  Mississippi Highway 333
  New Mexico State Road 333
 New York:
  New York State Route 333 (former)
  County Route 333 (Erie County, New York)
  County Route 333 (Steuben County, New York)
 Ohio State Route 333 (disambiguation)
  Pennsylvania Route 333
  South Carolina Highway 333
  Tennessee State Route 333
 Texas:
  Texas State Highway 333 (former)
  Texas State Highway Loop 333 (former)
  Farm to Market Road 333
  Virginia State Route 333
  Wyoming Highway 333 (former)

Other areas:
  Puerto Rico Highway 333
  U.S. Virgin Islands Highway 333